Mortha is a village in East Godavari district of Andhra Pradesh, India. There is a lot of history involved with this village. One of them is Kukkamondem(Dogs trunk)

Geography
Mortha is located at 16°80′N 81°70′E. It has an average elevation of 13 meters (42 feet). The historical River Gosthani flows along Mortha. The village is just 5 km away from the river Godavari.

Demographics 

 Census of India, Mortha had a population of 6663. The total population constitute, 3285 males and 3378 females with a sex ratio of 1028 females per 1000 males. 640 children are in the age group of 0–6 years, with sex ratio of 839. The average literacy rate stands at 72.22%.

References

Villages in East Godavari district